The Kid Who Couldn't Miss is a 1983 docudrama film directed by Paul Cowan. Produced by the National Film Board of Canada, it combines fact and fiction to question fighter pilot Billy Bishop's accomplishments during World War I, featuring excerpts from John MacLachlan Gray's play Billy Bishop Goes to War. The film specifically questions accounts of Bishop's solo mission to attack a German aerodrome on June 2, 1917, for which he was awarded a Victoria Cross, and suggests the event was imaginary and that Bishop exaggerated his own accomplishments.

In one particularly contentious scene, his mechanic claims that the damage to his fighter was confined to a small circle in a non-critical area, implying that Bishop had landed his aircraft off-field, shot the holes in it, and then flown home with claims of combat damage. In reality, his mechanic was his biggest supporter in this issue and the scene was entirely fictitious. The mechanic insisted that Bishop had not fabricated the damage.

Production
Paul Cowan became interested in making a movie about Bishop while making Stages. He decided to investigate Bishop because of Billy Bishop Goes to War. While researching for the film Cowan discovered recordings of pilots in Bishop's squadron who criticized Bishop and learned that Bishop's kills were never confirmed. The film had a budget of $334,560.

Reaction
After years of controversy over Bishop's record, mainly because very few of his claimed victories were witnessed by anyone else or could be confirmed from surviving German records, the show led to an inquiry by the Canadian government in 1985. The Standing Senate Committee on Social Affairs, Science and Technology discredited the documentary, saying it was an unfair and inaccurate portrayal of Bishop. The NFB's Commissioner, François N. Macerola, was called before the committee, but refused to accede to their demands that he withdraw the film from circulation.

3,000 letters were sent criticizing the movie.

Canadian veterans' groups were outraged by the insinuation, and Cowan received many irate letters, "He got inundated by thousands of furious letters, rumblings in the Senate subcommittee on Veterans' Affairs, and demands that the government cut off funding to the NFB."

Cowan and NFB commissioner François N. Macerola appeared before the Senate of Canada in 1985. Members of the senate criticized the film as damaging to Canada's national image and pride by having documentary and drama combined. Macerola refused to withdraw the film, but his recommendation to have the film labeled as a docudrama was accepted. The Senate made another inquiry into the film in 1986.

Minister of Communications Flora MacDonald told Macerola "Get rid of the problem. I'm fed up with it." in 1987. Clifford Chadderton, president of The War Amps, wanted the film to be re-edited, but accepted Macerola's compromise to create another film.

Chadderton created the film The Billy Bishop Controversy to counter the bias he and other veterans perceived in the NFB film. Released in 1986, it attempts to demonstrate that Cowan and the NFB did not properly research the historical records, and reached faulty conclusions about Bishop. The Kid Who Couldn't Miss also led Chicago native, and Bishop fan, Albert Lowe to create a website (www.billybishop.net) devoted to the fighter pilot. Lowe complained about the characterization of Bishop in the film, and commented that "That year Mr. Paul Cowan, with $514,007.00 of Canadian Taxpayer's money, did one of the foulest deeds possible without committing some form of violence."

References

Works cited

External links

Watch The Kid Who Couldn't Miss at NFB.ca

National Film Board of Canada films
Canadian docudrama films
World War I aviation films
Films directed by Paul Cowan
Canadian aviation films
1983 documentary films
1983 films
English-language Canadian films
French-language Canadian films
1980s Canadian films